Marvel Team-Up is an American comic book series published by Marvel Comics. The series featured two or more Marvel characters in one story. The series was originally published from March 1972 through February 1985, and featured Spider-Man as the lead "team-up" character in all but ten of its 150 issues, and in six of its seven Annuals. It was the first major ongoing spin-off series for Spider-Man, being preceded only by the short-lived The Spectacular Spider-Man magazine. Of the issues that did not star Spider-Man, the Human Torch headlines six issues (#18, 23, 26, 29, 32, 35); the Hulk, four (#97, 104, 105, and Annual #3); and Aunt May, one (#137). Publication of most of the issues starring the Human Torch coincided with that of Giant-Size Spider-Man, an alternate Spider-Man "team-up"-themed series by the regular Marvel Team-Up creative team.  When cancelled with #150 in 1985, the title was replaced by Web of Spider-Man.

The second series was published for 11 issues from September 1997 through July 1998 and originally featured Spider-Man; Namor the Sub-Mariner was the featured character starting with #8. From 1995 to 1997, a quarterly series titled Spider-Man Team-Up fulfilled much the same purpose as the original title. The third Marvel Team-Up series, written by Robert Kirkman, began publication in January 2005 and frequently featured Spider-Man. This volume often reintroduced lesser-known Marvel characters that had fallen into obscurity.

The spirit of Marvel Team-Up was carried on by Avenging Spider-Man and later by Superior Spider-Man Team-Up.

Publication history
Comics journalist Jonathan Miller summarized Marvel Team-Up in a retrospective article: 

The series debuted with a March 1972 cover-dated issue featuring Spider-Man and the Human Torch in a story by writer Roy Thomas and artist Ross Andru. Spider-Man and the Human Torch were originally the permanent headliners on the series, but the creators found this format limiting, and after just three issues the Human Torch was dropped in favor of a rotating co-star slot. The main artists on the series for the first several years were Andru, Gil Kane, Sal Buscema, and Jim Mooney.

In 1974, Marvel started publishing Giant-Size Spider-Man, which was a quarterly 68-page comic that lasted for six issues which complemented Marvel Team-Up. The series featured team-ups, with each issue featuring a new story with a back-up reprint, except the last issue, which only featured a reprint.

Due to the limitations of the typically single-issue team-up stories, the supporting cast of Spider-Man's other titles rarely appeared in Marvel Team-Up. The series often featured non-superhero characters in the co-star slot. A multi-issue time travel story arc began in issue #41 with Spider-Man and the Scarlet Witch traveling to the Salem witch trials in 1692, and pushed the barriers of continuity by having Spider-Man team up with two characters who had no established connection to the mainstream Marvel Universe, Killraven and Deathlok. Though the series did often team Spider-Man with other highly popular characters, it regularly gave the co-star slot to obscure characters that the average reader was unlikely to even recognize, particularly during writer J. M. DeMatteis's run. DeMatteis recounted, "I was always attracted to the more obscure characters, mainly because they were ripe for exploration. You could crack them open and really develop them. ... I just looked at these fringe characters as more inviting than the mainstream, more established characters - who all had their set-in-stone continuity. I wanted room to play and those characters gave me all the room I wanted. And let's face it, our lead character was as mainstream as you can get, so the obscure ones made for a nice contrast."

With issue #47, the series had a crossover with Marvel Two-in-One #17, which featured the Thing. Jean DeWolff was introduced as a supporting character in the Spider-Man/Iron Man story in issue #48.

John Byrne, who would later become the artist on The Uncanny X-Men, first drew the characters in Marvel Team-Up #53. Byrne and his Uncanny X-Men collaborator, writer Chris Claremont worked together on several issues of Marvel Team-Up. Captain Britain, a character created for Marvel UK, made his first appearance in an American comic book in Marvel Team-Up #65 (January 1978).

Karma, a character that later joined the New Mutants, was created by Claremont and artist Frank Miller in #100's lead story. A photo cover by Eliot R. Brown was used for the Spider-Man/Captain America team-up in issue #128.

Though published for well over a decade, the series format never truly caught on with readers. Upon taking a serious look at sales figures for Marvel Team-Up, Marvel's editorial staff found that sales dramatically rose or fell with each issue depending solely on the popularity of that issue's co-star. Taking this into consideration, Marvel editor-in-chief Jim Shooter concluded that it would make more sense to have another Spider-Man solo series with guest stars appearing when the storyline and/or promotional needs called for it, rather than a team-up series which unnaturally forced guest-stars upon the story. The series ended with issue #150 (February 1985), to be replaced by Web of Spider-Man.

A Hulk and the Human Torch story written by Jack C. Harris and drawn by Steve Ditko in the 1980s that was intended for Marvel Team-Up was published by Marvel as Incredible Hulk and the Human Torch: From the Marvel Vault #1 in August 2011.

Spider-Man Team-Up was a brief attempt to revive the concept of the series and was soon followed by Marvel Team-Up vol. 2 which was published from September 1997 to July 1998. The third Marvel Team-Up series launched in January 2005 and ran for 25 issues which starred a variety of characters. The fourth series began with a June 2019 cover date and contains legacy numbering.

Marvel Team-Up

Annuals

Spider-Man Team-Up

Marvel Team-Up vol. 2

Marvel Team-Up vol. 3

Marvel Team-Up vol. 4

Collected editions

Volume 1
 Marvel Masterworks: Marvel Team-Up
 Vol. 1 collects issue #1-11, 248 pages, December 2010, 
 Vol. 2 collects issue #12-22, 256 pages, June 2012, 
 Vol. 3 collects issue #23-30, Giant-Size Spider-Man #1-3, 272 pages, May 2018, 
 Vol. 4 collects issue #31-40, Giant-Size Spider-Man #4-5, Marvel Comics Calendar 1975, 296 pages, January 2019, 
 Vol. 5 collects issue #41-52, 304 pages, August 2020, 
 Vol. 6 collects issue #53-64, 320 pages, August 2021, 
 Essential Marvel Team-Up 
 Vol. 1 collects issue #1-24, 496 pages, April 2002,  
 Vol. 2 collects #25-51, 528 pages, August 2006,  
 Vol. 3 collects #52-73, #75, and Annual #1, 480 pages, September 2009,   
 Vol. 4 collects #76-78, 80–98, and Annual #2-3, 480 pages, February 2013,  
 Spider-Man: Marvel Team-Up by Claremont & Byrne includes Marvel Team-Up #59-70, 75, 240 pages, December 2011, 
 Fantastic Four/Spider-Man Classic includes Marvel Team-Up #100 and #132-133, 152 pages, April 2005,  
 Essential Defenders
 Vol. 5 includes Marvel Team-Up #101, 111 and 116, 448 pages, August 2010, 
 Vol. 6 includes Marvel Team-Up #119, 528 pages, October 2011,   
 Spider-Man: The Complete Alien Costume Saga 
 Volume 1 includes Marvel Team-Up #141-145, Annual #7, 488 pages, January 2012,  
 Volume 2 includes Marvel Team-Up #146-150, 504 pages, May 2015,

Spider-Man Team-Up
 Spider-Man: The Complete Clone Saga Epic Vol. 5 includes Spider-Man Team-Up #1, 424 pages, April 2010,  
 Spider-Man: The Complete Ben Reilly Epic 
 Volume 3 includes Spider-Man Team-Up #2, 432 pages, January 2012,  
 Volume 4 includes Spider-Man Team-Up #3, 464 pages, April 2012,   
 Volume 5 includes Spider-Man Team-Up #4, 464 pages, July 2012,   
 Volume 6 includes Spider-Man Team-Up #5, 448 pages, November 2012,   
 Thunderbolts Classic Vol. 1 includes Spider-Man Team-Up #7, 296 pages, April 2011,

Volume 3
 Marvel Team-Up 
 Vol. 1: The Golden Child collects Marvel Team-Up vol. 3 #1-6, 144 pages, June 2005,  
 Vol. 2: Master of the Ring collects Marvel Team-Up vol. 3 #7-13, 176 pages, December 2005,  
 Vol. 3: League of Losers collects Marvel Team-Up vol. 3 #14-18, 120 pages, June 2006,  
 Vol. 4: Freedom Ring collects Marvel Team-Up vol. 3 #19-25, 168 pages, February 2007,

Volume 4 

 Ms. Marvel Team-Up collects Marvel Team-Up vol. 4 #1-6, November 2019,

See also
 The Brave and the Bold - The first DC Comics equivalent.
 DC Comics Presents - The second DC Comics equivalent.
 Ultimate Marvel Team-Up - The Ultimate Marvel Universe's team-up series.

References

External links
 Marvel Team-Up at the Unofficial Handbook of Marvel Comics Creators

1972 comics debuts
1985 comics endings
1997 comics debuts
1998 comics endings
2005 comics debuts
2006 comics endings
2019 comics debuts
Comics by Chris Claremont
Comics by Gerry Conway
Comics by J. M. DeMatteis
Comics by Len Wein
Comics by Louise Simonson
Comics by Roy Thomas
Marvel Comics titles
Spider-Man titles
Team-up comics